Carnival is a 1935 American comedy film directed by Walter Lang and starring Jimmy Durante and Sally Eilers.

The film also includes a young Lucille Ball in a small uncredited role as a nurse.

Cast
Lee Tracy as Chick Thompson
Sally Eilers as Dasiy
Jimmy Durante as Fingers
Florence Rice as Miss Holbrook
Thomas E. Jackson as Mac
Dickie Walters as Poochy (as John Richard Walters)

References

External links
 

1935 films
Films directed by Walter Lang
Columbia Pictures films
Films with screenplays by Robert Riskin
1935 romantic comedy films
American romantic comedy films
American black-and-white films
1930s American films